Guadalupe is a city in Northern Peru, capital of the district Guadalupe in the region La Libertad. This town is located some 127 km north Trujillo city and is primarily an agricultural center in the Jequetepeque Valley.

The Universidad Nacional de Trujillo has a small campus on the north east edge of Guadalupe.

See also
Jequetepeque Valley
Pacasmayo
Chepén

References

 
Populated places in La Libertad Region
Cities in La Libertad Region